Lowell Darling is an American conceptual artist most notable for a series of performances in the 1970s that included nailing cities to the earth, conducting "urban acupuncture" by placing oversize needles in the ground, and stitching up the San Andreas Fault. He practiced "Contemporary Archaeology" by dumpster diving and using the articles he pulled from the trash bins to create "Found Object" art works. Many of these found objects were 35mm film strips discarded by Hollywood editing studios. These form much of his Hollywood Archaeology series, which was made into a website  sponsored by the Whitney Museum of Art in 1995. Other art of his includes a run for public office in the 1978 California gubernatorial election, when his primary challenge to Governor Jerry Brown received some 62,000 votes. He is the creator of the "Fat City School of Finds Art," an unaccredited institution that grants free Masters and PhD degrees to arts students. Frustrated by the IRS's categorizing of his art practice as that of a "hobbyist" (and thus denying tax deductions for expenses), he worked closely with lawyer Monroe Price to creatively consider the intersection of art and taxes; and in 1975, Darling and Price organized "The Artists & Lawyers Ball," an event benefiting Advocates for the Arts.

In 2010, 32 years after their last election faceoff, Darling once again challenged Jerry Brown in the race for governor. He has described that 2010 run as a means to raise awareness about California's requirement of a two-thirds majority to pass a budget or tax.

External links 
 Lowell Darling.com 
 Under the Big Black Sun exhibition website

References 

1942 births
American conceptual artists
American video artists
Artists from the San Francisco Bay Area
Artists from California
American performance artists
Living people
Nut artists